Yurovo is a rural locality (a selo) in Kurilovskoye Rural Settlement, Sobinsky District, Vladimir Oblast, Russia. The population was 21 as of 2010.

Geography 
Kopytovo is the nearest rural locality.

References 

Rural localities in Sobinsky District